Nikolai Alexandrovich Smolensky, born 11 June 1980, is a Russian banker and businessman.

Smolensky is the son of businessman Alexander Smolensky, the former head of large Russian bank Agroprombank/SBS-Agro-Bank which collapsed in 1998. He is an associate of fellow Russian businessman Roman Abramovich, and due to his wealth, youth and his oligarch father, has been dubbed in the press as the "baby oligarch".

Raised as "a sworn enemy of communism", according to his father, Smolensky was educated in Austria and England. After his father's bank SBS-Agro collapsed in 1998, Alexander launched a new banking group, First OVK. In 2003, this was handed to Nikolai, who declared it would triple in size to 1,500 branches. Two months later, he sold the business for an estimated £80m to Rosbank, a member of Interros Group.

On 27 July 2004, Smolensky bought British carmaker TVR. He also has connections with Italian motorbike manufacturer Benelli.

Nikolay Smolensky has been involved in education investments such as School President in Moscow and the Moscow Economic School.

In June 2013, it was confirmed that Nikolay Smolensky had sold his entire ownership of TVR to a syndicate of British Businessmen led by Les Edgar, a millionaire British entrepreneur.

In 2020 Smolensky finished constructing a 50,000 sq ft.
house outside Moscow with 26 bathrooms, 15 bedrooms, an indoor basketball court and swimming pools. In early 2021 he finished constructing his 4 floor guest house on the same property with 10 bedrooms, 8 bathrooms, a movie theatre along with a 12 room basement. The average cost of the property, with its main house along with the guest house was estimated about $16-20M

References

1980 births
Living people
Russian oligarchs
Russian bankers
TVR

Automotive businesspeople
Russian businesspeople in transport